Lycée Français de Madrid (LFM) is a French international school in Madrid, Spain. It serves levels maternelle (preschool) until lycée (senior high school). It is directly operated by the Agency for French Education Abroad. It has two campuses: the Conde de Orgaz in Hortaleza, northeast Madrid and Saint-Exupéry in La Moraleja, Alcobendas. As of 2012 it is the world's largest French international school.

History
It was established in an apartment on Calle Santa Isabel in 1885, with 50 students. It previously occupied a campus on Calle Marqués de la Ensenada.

In 1980 the Spanish journalist and writer  wrote a letter to the editor to El País urging for the school to be saved after an announcement came stating that the school may close due to financial difficulties.

The school celebrated its 125th anniversary in 2011.

Operations
As of 2009 there were 290 teachers and 100 other employees. The French government provides salaries for the teachers.

As of 2009 base tuition was 800 euros per student along with course fees which ranged from 3,700 euros to 4,200 euros per student.

Campuses
The Conde de Orgaz campus was designed by Spanish architect Alfredo Rodriguez Orgaz and two French architects, Pierre Sonrel and Jean Duthilleul. The Conde de Orgaz campus has five libraries, a theatre, athletic facilities, and computer rooms.

Student body
As of 2009 about half of the school's 3,945 students were Spanish and about half came from France and other Francophone countries.

In 2012 the Conde de Orgaz campus had 3,500 students.

As of 2009 the alumni association has over 500 members.

Athletics
The LFM rugby team was established in 1968 by the efforts of Luis Abad "Luison". As of 2012 it was the most common sport among Conde de Orgaz campus students due to rugby's role in the French school curriculum. This same School also has a record of football wins with its non-professional team: Liceo Sport. The star players in the 2015-2016 season being Anacleto Cortezón, Gaël de Puertas, Elcom Emocos, Manuel Bonaparte, Avolo Franco and the top league scorer Velja Tebiola.

Notable alumni
The alumni include actors, economists, and politicians.
 Hiba Abouk - Spanish actress
 José Luis Álvarez - Spanish politician
 Hugues Aufray - French singer
 Miguel Bosé - Spanish musician and actor
 Louis Alphonse de Bourbon - French Legitimist pretender
 Miguel Ángel Moratinos - Spanish politician
 Raimundo Saporta - Spanish basketball administrator
  - Spanish politician and economist
 Tristán Ulloa - Spanish actor
 Antonio Vega (singer) - Spanish songwriter, singer and composer
 Enzo Zidane - French-Spanish football player and son of former French international player Zinedine Zidane
 Mohamed Mahmoud Ould Mohamedou - Mauritanian Minister of Foreign Affairs, Harvard Scholar and political historian
 Beatriz Derqui - Former student at University of Bath and current member of the Maths department at the University Of Warwick.

See also
 
 Liceo Español Luis Buñuel, a Spanish international school near Paris, France

References

External links

  Lycée Français de Madrid
  Lycée Français de Madrid
  Asociacion Cultural y Deportiva del Liceo Frances de Madrid
  Asociación Antiguos Alumnos Liceo Francés de Madrid (AAALFM; Association des Anciens Élèves du Lycée Français de Madrid)

Madrid
International schools in Madrid
International schools in the Community of Madrid
Private schools in Spain
AEFE managed schools
Schools in Alcobendas